The 1949 Washington Huskies football team was an American football team that represented the University of Washington during the 1949 college football season. In its second season under head coach Howard Odell, the team compiled a 3–7 record, finished in a tie for sixth place in the Pacific Coast Conference, and was outscored by its opponents by a combined total of 285 to 167. Chuck Olson was the team captain.

Schedule

NFL Draft selections
Two University of Washington Huskies were selected in the 1950 NFL Draft, which lasted 30 rounds with 391 selections.

References

Washington
Washington Huskies football seasons
Washington Huskies football